The Ambassador Bridge is a tolled international suspension bridge across the Detroit River that connects Detroit, Michigan, United States, with Windsor, Ontario, Canada. Opened in 1929, it is the busiest international border crossing in North America in terms of trade volume, carrying more than 25% of all merchandise trade between the United States and Canada by value. A 2004 Border Transportation Partnership study showed that 150,000 jobs in the Detroit–Windsor region and US$13 billion in annual production depend on the Detroit–Windsor international border crossing.

The bridge is one of the few privately owned US–Canada crossings; it was owned by Grosse Pointe billionaire Manuel Moroun, until his death in July 2020, through the Detroit International Bridge Company in the United States and the Canadian Transit Company in Canada. In 1979, when the previous owners put it on the New York Stock Exchange and shares were traded, Moroun was able to buy shares, eventually acquiring the bridge. The bridge carries 60 to 70 percent of commercial truck traffic in the region. Moroun also owned the Ammex Detroit duty free stores at both the bridge and the tunnel.

History

The passage across the Detroit River became an important traffic route following the American Civil War. The Michigan Central and the Great Western railroads in addition to others operated on either side of the border connecting Chicago with the Atlantic Seaboard. To cross the Detroit River, these railroads operated ferries between docks on either side. The ferries lacked the capacity to handle the shipping needs of the railroads, and there were often 700–1,000 freight cars waiting to cross the river, with numerous passengers delayed in transit. Warehouses in Chicago were forced to store grain that they could not ship to eastern markets and foreign goods were stored in eastern warehouses waiting shipment to the western United States. The net effect of these delays increased commodity prices in the country, and both merchants and farmers wanted a solution from the railroads.

The Michigan Central proposed the construction of a tunnel under the river with the support of their counterparts at the Great Western Railway. Construction started in 1871 and continued until ventilating equipment failed the next year; work was soon abandoned. Attention turned in 1873 to the alternative of building a railroad bridge over the river. The U.S. Army Corps of Engineers commissioned a study of a bridge over the Detroit River. Representatives of the shipping industry on the Great Lakes opposed any bridge with piers in the river as a hazard to navigation. Discussions continued for the remainder of the decade to no avail; a bridge over the Detroit River was not approved. The U.S. Congress requested a new study for a bridge in 1889, but no bridge was approved. Finally, the Michigan Central built the Detroit River Tunnel in 1909–10 to carry trains under the river. This tunnel benefited the Michigan Central and Great Western railroads, but the Canada Southern Railway and other lines still preferred a bridge over the river. Plans for a bridge were revived in 1919 to commemorate the end of World War I and to honor the "youth of Canada and the United States who served in the Great War".

However neither Ontario nor Michigan wanted to finance a river crossing. Michigan automakers subsequently decided to take the initiative to connect the Midwest to central Canada. After they created a bridge company, the project got into trouble when a Toronto financier hired to sell its securities instead embezzled the money and ran off, before ultimately committing suicide in a prison cell after conviction for murdering a drugstore clerk. The bridge boosters turned to New Yorker Joseph A. Bower, a businessman who specialized in rescuing mismanaged companies. Bower succeeded in raising the necessary initial $12 million. "The only way things can be done today, is by private business," said Henry Ford, who backed the project. The bridge was constructed with investment from Detroit business people incorporated as the Detroit International Bridge Corporation. Berkshire Hathaway acquired a quarter of the shares before selling to another investor in the company, local trucking entrepreneur Manuel Moroun. Moroun continued buying further eventually privatizing it.

The Ambassador Bridge opened November 15, 1929, at a total cost of $23.5 million.

In April 1930, shortly after the bridge opened, a Canadian immigration inspector jumped to his death. The bridge has been used by other suicide jumpers. After it opened, high divers considered it as a venue for a record; but after measurements of the height and currents were taken into account, they were dissuaded and abandoned the attempt.

On November 14, 2000, a scaffold on the bridge collapsed, sending three men into the Detroit River and leaving four workers dangling from safety harnesses. Jamie Barker, one of the workers who fell into the water, died. An engineer, George Snowden, was disciplined by Professional Engineers Ontario for his role in the collapse; in 2012, a design that Snowden approved caused the Radiohead stage collapse in Toronto. Snowden's associate Domenic Cugliari was also involved in both collapses.

Access to the Ambassador Bridge was impeded by protesters during the Freedom Convoy 2022 protests in Canada. Protesters at the bridge blockaded it on February 7. On the evening of February 7, traffic at the bridge came to a complete halt. The blockade continued into February 8. On the morning of February 8, officials declared the bridge reopened, but the blockade later resumed, pushing trips to the Blue Water Bridge between Sarnia and Port Huron.

Utilization statistics 

Transport Canada reported the following distribution for the 20 largest U.S.–Canada border crossings by trucks in 2011:
 24.4% for Windsor-Ambassador Bridge
 14.4% for Sarnia–Blue Water Bridge
 11.4% for Fort Erie–Peace Bridge
 7.0% for  Pacific Highway/ Douglas 
 6.6% for Niagara Falls–Queenston Bridge

Design

The bridge over the Detroit River had the longest suspended central span in the world when it was completed in 1929—. This record held until the George Washington Bridge between New York and New Jersey opened in 1931. Construction began in 1927 and was completed in 1929. The general contractor and steel erector was the McClintic-Marshall Company of Pittsburgh, Pennsylvania.

The bridge is made up of 21,000 short tons (19,000 tonnes) of steel, and the roadway rises as high as 152 feet (46 m) above the Detroit River. Only the main span over the river is supported by suspension cables; the approaches to the main pillars are held up by steel in a cantilever truss structure.

The bridge's only sidewalk is on the structure's southwest side. After the September 11 attacks, pedestrians and bicycles were prohibited from traveling across the bridge due to increased security measures. For years prior to September 11, 2001, the sidewalk was closed due to ongoing maintenance projects and repainting.

Originally painted gloss black, the bridge underwent a five-year refurbishment between 1995 and 2000, which included stripping and repainting the bridge teal.

Granite blocks, originally used on the U.S. side, were given to the Windsor Parks and Recreation Department, and now grace many of the pathways in Windsor parks.

Capacity
The Ambassador Bridge is the busiest crossing on the Canada–United States border. The four-lane bridge carries more than 10,000 commercial vehicles on a typical weekday. The Gateway Project, a major redesign of the U.S. plaza completed in July 2009, provides direct access to Interstate 96 (I-96) and I-75 on the American side and Highway 3 on the Canadian side. The Canadian end of the bridge connects to busy city streets in west Windsor, leading to congestion.

The privately-owned bridge carries approximately 25% of trade between Canada and the United States.

Additional bridge proposals

The Canadian and United States governments have approved the construction of the Gordie Howe International Bridge proposed by the Detroit River International Crossing (DRIC) commission. The new bridge further downriver between Detroit and Windsor will be owned and operated by the Windsor–Detroit Bridge Authority, a Crown corporation owned by the Canadian federal government.

Manuel Moroun, owner of the Ambassador Bridge until his death in 2020, spoke out against this proposal. He sued the governments of Canada and Michigan to stop its construction, and released a proposal to build a second span of the Ambassador Bridge (which he would own) instead. Critics suggest that Moroun's opposition was fueled by the prospect of lost profits from duty-free gasoline sales, which are exempt from about 60 cents per gallon in taxes even though the pump price to consumers is only a few cents lower. On May 5, 2011, a judge dismissed the case, citing a lack of reasoning for it to proceed. Moroun and his Detroit International Bridge Company contended that the new bridge would affect its proposal for a second span which would be built next to the Ambassador Bridge.

A twin span adjacent to the Ambassador Bridge, by itself, does not address Canadian concerns about traffic on Huron Church Road in Windsor. While many of the stop lights commonly cited have been removed by the expansion of Highway 401 which will connect to the downriver Howe bridge, the final approach to the Ambassador Bridge remains on overcrowded Windsor surface streets.

In 2007, the privately owned bridge company was granted a permit by the Michigan Department of Environmental Quality to build a new bridge across the Detroit River adjacent to the existing span. The permit expired in 2012. The U.S. Coast Guard issued the bridge company a permit in 2016 to construct the new span. As of 2021, construction cannot proceed until current bridge owner Matthew Moroun addresses a "conflict" with the bridge's permit issued for the Canadian side by Transport Canada in 2017. The Coast Guard permit was granted on the condition that the existing Ambassador Bridge would be retained and rehabilitated, while the Transport Canada permit was granted on the condition that the existing bridge would be dismantled and removed.

Controversies
The bridge's private ownership has been controversial as the bridge carries approximately 25% of trade between Canada and the United States. Although alternate routes exist, including the nearby Detroit–Windsor Tunnel, preventing monopoly status, the route is of significant value since it passes directly through major metropolitan areas. The aforementioned tunnel prohibits certain vehicles.

In 2010 and 2011, the Wayne County Circuit Court found the Detroit International Bridge Company in contempt for failing to directly connect bridge access roads to I-75 and I-96, and making other required improvements as part of the Gateway Project. These improvements would normally be under the control of the state government; however, the Detroit International Bridge Company withheld the improvements as part of a negotiation strategy.  At one point, Matty Moroun and his chief deputy at the Detroit International Bridge Co, Dan Stamper, were jailed for non-compliance with orders to complete the on-ramps.

After years of legal battles, activism by local people against neighborhood truck traffic, and stalling by Matty Moroun, the Michigan Department of Transportation (MDOT) took over the I-75/I-96 on-ramp project and opened the ramps in September 2012 after a six-month construction period. One possible motive for the Gateway Project delays was Moroun's desire to route traffic past his lucrative duty-free store and fuel pumps, one of only two border locations to sell untaxed fuel (the other is International Falls, Minnesota). Critics of the duty-free fuel operation objected that sixty cents from each U.S. gallon went not to paving Michigan's underfunded highways but instead directly to Matty Moroun.

Operators of large trucks under the International Fuel Tax Agreement, which in theory should impose Ontario tax and partially refund Michigan tax on fuel purchased in Detroit and consumed on Ontario's Highway 401, may be disqualified for the Michigan IFTA refund, as the tax was never paid. In a 2012 lawsuit, the Michigan Department of Agriculture and Rural Development sued Moroun's company, Ammex, claiming it mislabeled motorcar fuels to advertise 93 octane while tests showed as little as 91.2 octane.

In 2015, Windsor city officials criticized the decaying appearance of the bridge and called attention to the hazard posed by crumbling concrete from its superstructure. In response, Matt Moroun accused the city of attempting to thwart the company's efforts to rebuild or repair the structure because the Canadian government is supporting plans for a new bridge across the Detroit River downriver.

On February 7, 2022, a blockade related to the Freedom Convoy protests shut down traffic on the bridge for about a week, causing disruptions at automobile manufacturing plants on both sides of the border.

See also

 Blue Water Bridge, which links Port Huron, Michigan, to Sarnia, Ontario
 Sault Ste. Marie International Bridge, which links Sault Ste. Marie, Michigan, to Sault Ste. Marie, Ontario
 List of bridges in Canada

References

Further reading

External links

 Ambassador Bridge Official Website
 
 Detroit News archives: The Building of the Ambassador Bridge
 NPR profile: Private Bridge on Canada Border a Security Concern
 Southwestern Ontario Digital Archive: Subject: Ambassador Bridge (Windsor Detroit)

Art Deco architecture in Canada
Art Deco architecture in Michigan
Bridges completed in 1929
Bridges in Detroit
Buildings and structures in Windsor, Ontario
Canada–United States border crossings
Canada–United States bridges
Detroit River
Lake Erie Circle Tour
Road bridges in Michigan
Road bridges in Ontario
Suspension bridges in Canada
Suspension bridges in the United States
Toll bridges in Michigan
Toll bridges in Canada
Towers in Michigan
Towers in Ontario
Transport in Windsor, Ontario
Steel bridges in the United States
Steel bridges in Canada
1929 establishments in Michigan
1929 establishments in Ontario